Jovan Trnić (born 3 December 1996) is a Serbian footballer who plays as a goalkeeper for Budućnost Dobanovci.

Club career

Partizan
Born in Sremska Mitrovica, Trnić has started his football career with youth categories of FK Sirmium. Later he moved to Srem and finally joined Partizan as a cadet. Next he passed youth categories with the club, he moved to the satellite club Teleoptik, where he also played as a member of youth team during the 2014–15 campaign, making a single appearance with the first squad in the Serbian League Belgrade. After Milan Lukač left the club in summer 2015, Trnić joined the first team of Partizan under coach Zoran Milinković. He was licensed for the Serbian SuperLiga and UEFA Europa League during the 2015–16 campaign with number 26 jersey. While with Partizan as a third goalkeeper behind Živko Živković and Filip Kljajić, Trnić was also loaned back to Teleoptik at dual registration for the first half-season. Next the club signed Bojan Šaranov and Marko Jovičić in the winter transfer window, Trnić extended his loan to Teleoptik for the rest of season. Trnić continued playing in the Serbian League Belgrade in the 2016–17 campaign, helping the team to win the competition and make a promotion to the Serbian First League. On the last day of January 2017, Trnić signed a three-year professional contract with Partizan. Trnić returned to the first team of Partizan under coach Miroslav Đukić, at the beginning of 2018. Passing the winter-break with the first team, Trnić also stayed with Teleoptik in the second half of the 2017–18 Serbian First League campaign.

Radnički Sremska
Ahead of the 2019-20 season, Trnić joined FK Radnički Sremska Mitrovica.

Career statistics

Club

Honours
 Teleoptik
Serbian League Belgrade: 2016–17

References

External links
 Jovan Trnić at serbiacorner.com
 
 
 

1996 births
Living people
Sportspeople from Sremska Mitrovica
Association football goalkeepers
Serbian footballers
FK Partizan players
FK Teleoptik players
Serbian First League players